is a Japanese footballer currently playing as a midfielder for Montedio Yamagata.

Career statistics

Club
.

Notes

References

1999 births
Living people
Association football people from Tokyo
Toyo University alumni
Japanese footballers
Japan youth international footballers
Association football midfielders
J2 League players
FC Tokyo players
Montedio Yamagata players